The Wollemi Creek, a partly perennial stream of the Hawkesbury-Nepean catchment, is located in the Central Tablelands and Blue Mountains regions of New South Wales, Australia.

Course and features
The Wollemi Creek rises below Kekeelbon Mountains on the southern slopes of Mount Mounundilla, within the Wollemi Range, in remote country within the Wollemi National Park, north northwest of the locality of Putty. The river descends  over its  course.

The primary inhabitants of the upper creek are yabbies, eels, and possums. Some ancient massive gums populate the lower gorges and very few signs of non–native infestations are apparent, one notable exception being mistletoe which infests the upper branches of the oldest trees.

See also

 Rivers of New South Wales
 List of rivers of New South Wales (L-Z)
 List of rivers of Australia
 Wollemia

References

External links
 Colo River Subcatchment at the Hawkesbury-Nepean Catchment Management Authority website

Hawkesbury River
Rivers of New South Wales
Central Tablelands
Singleton Council